Cristiano Migliozzi (born 25 July 2002) is an Italian footballer.

Career statistics

Notes

References

2002 births
Living people
Italian footballers
Association football midfielders
Benevento Calcio players
A.S. Pro Piacenza 1919 players
Serie C players